The Dead Moose River is a  tributary of the Kettle River in eastern Minnesota. Via the Kettle and St. Croix rivers, it is part of the watershed of the Mississippi River.

The Dead Moose River rises in Salo Township of eastern Aitkin County and flows generally eastwardly through Automba, Kalevala and Silver townships of southwestern Carlton County.

See also
List of Minnesota rivers

References

Rivers of Minnesota
Rivers of Aitkin County, Minnesota
Rivers of Carlton County, Minnesota
Tributaries of the Mississippi River